The following list of Protestant missionary societies is a list of Protestant Christian missionary organizations that began between 1691-1900.

Missionary societies in the United Kingdom
 1649 New England Company
 1691 Christian Faith Society for the West Indies
 1698 Society for Promoting Christian Knowledge
 1701 Society for the Propagation of the Gospel in Foreign Parts
 1709 Society in Scotland for the Propagation of Christian Knowledge
 1732 Moravian Missions
 1792 Baptist Missionary Society
 1795 London Missionary Society
 1796 Scottish Missionary Society
 1799 Church Missionary Society
 1799 Religious Tract Society
 1804 British and Foreign Bible Society
 1809 London Society for Promoting Christianity Amongst the Jews (now known as the Church's Ministry Among Jewish People or CMJ)
 1813 Wesleyan Missionary Society
 1817 General Baptist Missionary Society
 1823 Colonial and Continental Church Society
 1825 Church of Scotland Mission Boards
 1825 National Bible Society of Scotland
 1831 Trinitarian Bible Society
 1832 Wesleyan Ladies' Auxiliary for Female Education in Foreign Countries
 1835 United Secession (afterwards United Presbyterian) Foreign Missions
 1836 Colonial Missionary Society a.k.a. Commonwealth Missionary Society
 1840 Irish Presbyterian Missionary Society
 1840 Welsh Calvinistic Methodist Missionary Society
 1841 Colonial Bishoprics Fund
 1841 Edinburgh Medical Missionary Society
 1843 British Society for the Propagation of the Gospel Among the Jews
 1843 Free Church of Scotland Missions
 1843 Primitive Methodist African and Colonial Missions
 1843 Methodist New Connexion in England Foreign Missions
 1844 South American Missionary Society
 1847 Presbyterian Church in England Foreign Missions
 1858 Christian Vernacular Education Society for India
 1860 Central African Mission of the English Universities
 1865 China Inland Mission
 1865 Friends' Foreign Mission Association
 1866 Delhi Female Medical Mission
 1867 Friends' Mission in Syria and Palestine
 1877 Cambridge Mission to Delhi
 1880 Church of England Zenana Missionary Society
 1884 Presbyterian Mission to Korea
 1892 Student Volunteer Missionary Union

Missionary societies in the United States and Canada
 1733 Corporation for the Propagation of the Gospel in New England
 1773 unnamed project for propagating the Gospel to African Guinea with the help of former slaves organized by Ezra Stiles and Samuel Hopkins, its operations apparently disrupted by the American Revolutionary War
 1787 Society for Propagating the Gospel Among the Indians at Boston
 1795 Friends' Missionary Society
 1800 New York Missionary Society
 1800 Connecticut Missionary Society for Indians
 1803 United States Mission to the Cherokees
 1806 Western Missionary Society for Indians
 1810 American Board of Commissioners for Foreign Missions
 1814 American Baptist Missionary Union (later known as American Baptist Foreign Mission Society and then American Baptist International Ministries)
  1818 Female Missionary Society
 1819 Methodist Episcopal Church Missionary Society
 1826 American Home Missionary Society
 1832 American Baptist Home Mission Society
 1833 Free-will Baptist Foreign Missionary Society in India
 1835 Protestant Episcopal Church Mission
 1837 Board of Foreign Missions of the Presbyterian Church (North)
 1837 Evangelical Lutheran Foreign Missionary Society
 1842 Seventh Day Baptist Missionary Society
 1842 Strict Baptist Missionary Society
 1843 Baptist Free Missionary Society
 1845 Methodist Episcopal Church (South)
 1845 Southern Baptist Convention
 1846 American Missionary Association
 1849 American Christian Missionary Society
 1857 Board of Foreign Missions of (Dutch) Reformed Church
 1859 Board of Foreign Missions of United Presbyterian Church
 1861 Woman's Union Missionary Society of America for Heathen Lands
 1862 Board of Foreign Missions of the Presbyterian Church (South)
 1869 Woman's Foreign Missionary Society of the Methodist Episcopal Church
 1874 Christian Woman's Board of Missions
 1876 Foreign Christian Missionary Society
 1878 Evangelical Association Missionary Society
 1879 Woman's Foreign Missionary Society of the Methodist Protestant Church 
 1882 Woman's Foreign Missionary Society of the Free Methodist Church of North America
 1886 Student Volunteer Missionary Union

Missionary societies in Australia and New Zealand
 1864 Australian Baptist Missionary Society
 1885 New Zealand Baptist Missionary Society
 1892 Open Air Campaigners

Missionary societies in Continental Europe
 1799 Rhenish Missionary Society
 1815 Basel Mission
 1821 Danish Missionary Society
 1836 North German Missionary Society 
 1859 Finnish Missionary Society
 Liebenzell Mission

See also
 List of Protestant missionary societies in China 1807-1953
 Timeline of Christian missions
 List of women's missionary societies

Notes

References
 

Protestant
Missionary societies